Nitrogen generators and stations are stationary or mobile air-to-nitrogen production complexes.

Adsorption technology

Adsorption concept 

The adsorption gas separation process in nitrogen generators is based on the phenomenon of fixing various gas mixture components by a solid substance called an adsorbent. This phenomenon is brought about by the gas and adsorbent molecules' interaction.

Pressure swing adsorption technology 
The technology of air-to-nitrogen production with the use of adsorption processes in nitrogen generators is well studied and widely applied at industrial facilities for the recovery of high-purity nitrogen.

The operating principle of a nitrogen generator utilizing the adsorption technology is based upon the dependence of the adsorption rates featured by various gas mixture components upon pressure and temperature factors. Among nitrogen adsorption plants of various types, pressure swing adsorption (PSA) plants have found the broadest application world-wide.

The system's design is based on the regulation of gas adsorption and adsorbent regeneration by means of changing pressures in two adsorber–adsorbent-containing vessels. This process requires constant temperature, close to ambient. With this process, nitrogen is produced by the plant at the above-atmospheric pressure, while the adsorbent regeneration is accomplished at below-atmospheric pressure.

The swing adsorption process in each of the two adsorbers consists of two stages running for a few minutes. At the adsorption stage oxygen, H2O and CO2 molecules diffuse into the pore structure of the adsorbent whilst the nitrogen molecules are allowed to travel through the adsorber–adsorbent-containing vessel. At the regeneration stage the adsorbed components are released from the adsorbent vented into the atmosphere. The process is then multiplely repeated.

Advantages 
 High nitrogen purity: PSA nitrogen generator plants allow production of high-purity nitrogen from air, which membrane systems are unable to provide – up to 99.9995% nitrogen. But in most cases they do not produce more than 98.8% nitrogen with the remainder being argon that is not separated from the nitrogen by the usual PSA process. The argon is not normally a problem, as argon is more inert than nitrogen. This nitrogen purity may also be ensured by cryogenic systems, but they are considerably more complex and justified only by large consumption volumes. The nitrogen generators use CMS (carbon molecular sieve) technology to produce a continuous supply of ultra high purity nitrogen and are available with internal compressors or without.

 Low operating costs: By substitution of out-of-date air separation plants nitrogen production savings largely exceed 50%. The net cost of nitrogen produced by nitrogen generators is significantly less than the cost of bottled or liquefied nitrogen.

 Environmental impact: Generating nitrogen gas is a sustainable, environmentally friendly and energy efficient approach to providing pure, clean, dry nitrogen gas. Compared to the energy needed for a cryogenic air separation plant and the energy needed to transport the liquid nitrogen from the plant to the facility, generated nitrogen consumes less energy and creates far fewer greenhouse gases.

Membrane technology

Gas separation concept 
The operation of membrane systems is based on the principle of differential velocity with which various gas mixture components permeate membrane substance. The driving force in the gas separation process is the difference in partial pressures on different membrane sides.

Membrane cartridge 

Structurally, a hollow-fiber membrane represents a cylindrical cartridge functioning as a spool with specifically reeled polymer fibers. Gas flow is supplied under pressure into a bundle of membrane fibers. Due to the difference in partial pressures on the external and internal membrane surface gas flow separation is accomplished.

Advantages 
 Economic benefits: By substitution of cryogenic or adsorption systems nitrogen production savings generally exceed 50%. The net cost of nitrogen produced by nitrogen complexes is significantly less than the cost of cylinder or liquefied nitrogen.

 Module design: With respect to the simplicity of the system, a nitrogen generator can be split into modules. This is in direct contrast to classical systems where the equipment is designed for a certain stage of the separation process. Using a modular system, the generation facility may be built from a selection of preexisting equipment and where necessary, the output capacity of a plant may be increased at the minimum cost. This option appears all the more useful where a project envisages a subsequent increase in enterprise capacity, or where demand may simply require on site production of nitrogen by employing equipment that is already present.

 Dependability: Gas separation units have no moving component parts, thus ensuring exceptional reliability. Membranes are highly resistant to vibration and shocks, chemically inert to greases, moisture-insensitive, and capable of operating over a wide temperature range of –40°С to +60°С. With appropriate maintenance, membrane unit useful life ranges between 130,000 and 180,000 hours (15 to 20 years of continuous operation).

Disadvantages 
 Limited capacity
 Relatively low purity compared to PSA units (95% to 99% purity as compared to 99.9995% - higher purity applications are available at lower flow rates ≤ 10L/min)

Applications of nitrogen generators 
 Food and beverage industries: The moment food or beverages are produced, or fruits and vegetables harvested, an aging process kicks in until the complete decay of the products. This is caused by chemical reactions with oxygen, bacteria and other organisms. Generators are used to flood the products with N2 that displaces the oxygen and prolongs the product lifetime significantly because these organisms cannot develop. Furthermore, chemical degradation of food caused by oxidation can be eliminated or stopped.

 Analytical chemistry: Nitrogen generators are required for various forms of analytical chemistry such as liquid chromatography–mass spectrometry and gas chromatography where a stable and continuous supply of nitrogen is necessary.

 Aircraft & motor vehicle tires: Although air is 78% nitrogen, most aircraft tires are filled with pure nitrogen. There are many tire and automotive shops with nitrogen generators to fill tires. The advantage of using nitrogen is that the tank is dry. Often a compressed air tank will have water in it that comes from atmospheric water vapor condensing in the tank after leaving the air compressor. Nitrogen maintains a more stable pressure when heated and cooled as a result of being dry and doesn't permeate the tire as easily due to being a slightly larger molecule (155 pm) than O2 (152 pm).

 Chemical and petrochemical industries: The primary and very important application of nitrogen in chemical and petrochemical industries is the provision of inert environment aimed at ensuring general industrial safety during cleaning and protection of process vessels. In addition, nitrogen is used for pipelines pressure testing, chemical agents transportation, and regeneration of used catalysts in technological processes.
Aircraft tires use nitrogen fill to delay tire rupture on rejected take off events, allowing evacuation time before brake system heat causes an internal tire fire.  Fusible plugs in the tire are the primary protection against heat induced pressure excursion.  Internal tire fires can kindle at initial stop due to local hot sections of the wheels.
 Electronics: In electronics, nitrogen serves to displace oxygen in the manufacture of semi-conductors and electric circuits, heat treatment of finished products, as well as in blowing and cleaning. The most common uses in electronics are in the soldering process. Specifically Selective, Reflow, and Wave Soldering equipment. 

Fire Protection: The fire protection industry uses nitrogen gas for two different applications - fire suppression and corrosion prevention. Nitrogen generators are used in hypoxic air fire prevention systems to produce air with a low oxygen content which will suppress a fire. To prevent corrosion, nitrogen generators are used in place of or in conjunction with a compressed air system to provide supervisory nitrogen gas in place of air for dry pipe and pre-action fire sprinkler systems.

 Glass industry: In glass production, nitrogen proves efficient as a cooling agent for electric arc furnace electrodes as well as to displace oxygen during process procedures.

 Metallurgy: The metal industry generally utilizes nitrogen as a means of protecting ferrous and non-ferrous metals during annealing. Also, nitrogen is helpful in such standard industry processes as neutral tempering, cementing, hard brazing, stress relieving, cyanide hardening, metal-powder sintering and extrusion die cooling.

 Paint-and-varnish industry: Paint and varnish production uses nitrogen for the creation of an inert environment in process vessels to ensure safety, as well as for oxygen displacement during packing in order to prevent polymerization of drying oils.

 Petroleum industry: In the petroleum industry, nitrogen is an indispensable component in a number of processes. Most commonly, nitrogen is used to create an inert environment for preventing explosions and for fire safety and to support transportation and transfer of hydrocarbons. Additionally, nitrogen is used for pipeline testing and purging, cleaning technological vessels and cleaning liquefied gas carriers and hydrocarbon storage facilities.

 Pharmaceutical industry: In the pharmaceutical industry, nitrogen finds application in pharmaceuticals packaging, and ensuring against explosion and fire safety in activities where fine dispersed substances are used.

See also
Liquid nitrogen
Industrial gas

References 

Gas technologies
Nitrogen
Industrial gases